was an economist, educator, politician and cabinet minister in the pre-war Empire of Japan.

Background
Ogawa was born in Satoshō, Okayama as the son of Murayama Kikuzo, but was adopted into a prominent family of doctors in Okayama. He graduated from Tokyo Imperial University Imperial College of Law in 1903 with honors, from the Department of Political Science, and obtained a post at the Ministry of Finance. However, the following year, he was recruited by Kyoto Imperial University, which had just established a Department of Economics, and was sent to Europe for six years to study public finance in Germany and Austria. On his return, he worked at Kyoto Imperial University as a professor of economics, specializing on the economic effects of war. In 1917, he was awarded a doctorate in law.

Ogawa then entered politics, winning a seat in the House of Representatives of Japan in the 1917 general election, and was subsequently re-elected to the same seat in the Okayama constituency a total of eight times. Initially with the Shinseikai, he later assisted in the formation of the Seiyu Hontō political party, subsequently serving as president of its policy research committee, and joined the Rikken Minseitō when the Seiyu Hontō merged with the Kenseikai.

Ogawa left Kyoto Imperial University in 1924 to accept the post of dean of Takushoku University. In 1929, he served as parliamentary under-secretary for Finance under the Hamaguchi administration.

In 1936, Prime Minister Kōki Hirota asked that Ogawa accept the post of Minister of Commerce and Industry. In this position, he opposed many of the ministry bureaucrats who were pushing towards increased state control over the economy, and forced a number, including Nobusuke Kishi, to resign.

In 1940 he served in the second Konoe administration as Railway Minister. After the start of World War II, in 1943, he took charge of the committee of internal affairs of the Taisei Yokusankai. However, later in 1943, he was invited to the nominally independent State of Burma by President Ba Maw as a special advisor on economics and finance.  He spent the remainder of the war years in Burma, attempting to set the country on a secure footing through financial consolidation.

On April 1, 1945, while attempting to return to Japan, Ogawa was killed as a passenger on the Awa Maru, which was sunk by the US submarine  in the East China Sea despite its status as a hospital ship under Red Cross protection. In 1968, he was posthumously awarded with the Order of the Rising Sun, 3rd class.

References
 Dingman, Roger. (1997).  Ghost of War: The Sinking of the Awa Maru and Japanese-American Relations, 1945-1995. Annapolis: Naval Institute Press. ;  OCLC  37315278 
Iguchi, Haruo. Unfinished Business: Ayukawa Yoshisuke and U.S.-Japan Relations, 1937-1953. Harvard University Asia Center (2003)

Notes

 
 

1876 births
1945 deaths
People from Okayama Prefecture
Government ministers of Japan
Members of the House of Representatives (Japan)
University of Tokyo alumni
Kyoto University alumni
Academic staff of Kyoto University
Japanese civilians killed in World War II
Deaths due to shipwreck at sea
Imperial Rule Assistance Association politicians
Rikken Minseitō politicians
20th-century Japanese politicians